Heather Sharfeddin (born 1966) is a United States novelist. Her novels explore western themes based on her early life in Idaho and Montana. She lives in Oregon, where she teaches creative writing at Linfield College.

Life
Sharfeddin was born Heather Mason in remote Rosebud County, Montana to a forester father and an artist mother. In 1968, the Mason family moved to Riggins, Idaho on the Salmon River and later to nearby Lucile, where they lived in the remodeled Cow Creek pioneer schoolhouse. In those early years Sharfeddin and her two sisters enjoyed the remote Idaho back-country, collecting Indian artifacts and roughing it with local ranch kids. Sharfeddin remembers visiting such legendary places on the Salmon River as the Shepp Ranch and the Polly Bemis home, which were inaccessible by automobile. 
	
In 1977, Lynn Mason moved the family to East Lansing, Michigan where he obtained his master's degree in forestry at Michigan State University. They were happy to return west to Missoula, Montana in 1979. Sharfeddin attended Hellgate Junior High and Big Sky High School, graduating in 1984. She moved to Portland, Oregon in 1986.

Heather Sharfeddin holds an MFA in Writing from Vermont College of Fine Arts and PhD in Creative Writing from Bath Spa University in Bath, England.

Works
Her first novel Blackbelly, published in 2005 by Bridge Works Publishing, is set in central Idaho where she grew up. She draws her imagery and characters from those early years and the folklore of the Salmon River.

In 2006, her second novel Mineral Spirits was published, also by Bridge Works Publishing, and is set in remote Mineral County, Montana. Sharfeddin has called her work "contemporary western", which she defines as stories about the rural west that take place during the twentieth and twenty-first centuries. She promotes this genre through talks and seminars.

In 2009, her third novel Windless Summer was published by Random House (Delta imprint), and is set in the Columbia River Gorge in the fictional town of Rocket, Washington.

In 2010, Blackbelly was released in paperback under the title Sweetwater Burning by Random House (Bantam imprint).

In 2011, Sharfeddin's fourth novel Damaged Goods was published by Random House and is set in rural western Oregon. It follows the relationship of a brain-damaged auctioneer and a child sex-abuse survivor.

In September 2016 Sharfeddin's fifth novel "What Keeps You" will be released by Martin Brown Publishing.

Sharfeddin is contributor at Dirt & Seeds, a literary website, where she serialized an experimental novel, Between.

She regularly writes book reviews for Colorado Review, Center for Literary Publishing.

Miscellaneous
Riggins Mayor Bob Crump declared Wednesday, April 6, 2011, as "Heather Mason Sharfeddin Day"; in honor of the author's visit to sign her books.

External links
Heather Sharfeddin personal website
KBOO Radio interview with Sharfeddin
Newsreview.info review of Blackbelly with comments from Heather Sharfeddin

1966 births
Living people
21st-century American novelists
American women novelists
People from Rosebud County, Montana
People from Sherwood, Oregon
Idaho in fiction
Montana in fiction
Writers from Montana
Novelists from Idaho
Novelists from Oregon
21st-century American women writers
People from Idaho County, Idaho